Pune Marathas may refer to:

 Pune Marathas (American football), an American football team based in Pune, India
 Pune Marathas (tennis), a tennis team representing Pune, India